George Page (30 November 1898 – 1961)was an English footballer who made 149 appearances in the Football League playing for Barnsley, Ashington, Accrington Stanley, Lincoln City and Crewe Alexandra. He played as a left back. He also played in the Midland League for York City.

References

1898 births
1931 deaths
Footballers from Darlington
English footballers
Association football fullbacks
Doncaster Rovers F.C. players
Barnsley F.C. players
Ashington A.F.C. players
Accrington Stanley F.C. (1891) players
Lincoln City F.C. players
Crewe Alexandra F.C. players
York City F.C. players
English Football League players
Midland Football League players
Place of death missing